Sharifah Nor Azean binti Syed Mahadzir Al-Yahya (born 30 May 1983), better known by her stage name Scha Al-Yahya, is a Malaysian model, actress and TV host,
who plays the lead character Dania, a tomboy who struggles to achieve her dream of becoming a flight attendant, in the highly-rated TV series Awan Dania aired on Astro Ria for three seasons.

Life and career
Scha was born in Sungai Petani, Kedah to a family of Malay, Hadhrami Arab and Chinese descent. She is the second of four siblings. She holds a diploma in information technology from PTPL College, Shah Alam and previously worked as a flight stewardess in the local commercial airline, Airasia. She quit flying when she started her career after winning  the Dewi Remaja beauty pageant organised through Majalah Remaja, a local Malaysian Malay-language teen magazine, in 2006. Al-Yahya was then cast in a role by director Azizi "Chunk" Adnan.

Personal life

Scha married Awal Ashaari on May 4, 2012, after three years of dating. They met in 2008 when they co-hosted a reality series called Sehati Berdansa. Awal surprised her with his proposal live on TV through Propaganza, a local gossip TV programme guest-hosted by the actress. The couple welcomed their first child together, a daughter they named Lara Alana, on July 22, 2014. Their second daughter was born via caesarean on 12 February 2021, and her name was revealed to be Lyla Amina.

Filmography

Film

Telemovie

Television series

Television

Videography

TV commercials
 Bio Essence
 Hotlink
 Olay
 Nokia
 Celcom
 Yakult
 Rexona

Awards and nominations

Endorsements
Yakult Cultured Milk Drink
 Bio-Essence Skin Care  
 Silky Shine Shampoo
 Carefree  
 Watsons 
 Kenanga Wholesale City Mall 
 Avon Fragrances
 SNE Beautskin
 Rexona Deodorant
 Astro Megadrama Exclusive Talent
 JAKEL

References

External links

Scha Alyahya at the Sinema Malaysia

Living people
People from Kedah
Malaysian people of Malay descent
Malaysian people of Yemeni descent
Malaysian people of Chinese descent
Malaysian film actresses
Malaysian television personalities
1983 births
Malaysian beauty pageant winners
21st-century Malaysian actresses
Malaysian television actresses